Ina Halley (January 9, 1927 – June 7, 1992) was a German actress.

Selected filmography
 The Cuckoos (1949)
 The Merry Wives of Windsor (1950)
 Five Suspects (1950)
 Bluebeard (1951)
 The Prince of Pappenheim (1952)
 The Cousin from Nowhere (1953)
 The Bachelor Trap (1953)
 The Man of My Life (1954)
 The Faithful Hussar (1954)
 A Heart Full of Music (1955)
  (1961)

Bibliography
 Sammons, Eddie. Shakespeare: A Hundred Years on Film. Scarecrow Press, 2004.

External links

1927 births
1992 deaths
German film actresses
People from Chemnitz
20th-century German actresses
Burials at the Waldfriedhof Zehlendorf